James Monroe High School is a former comprehensive high school located at 1300 Boynton Avenue at East 172nd Street in the Soundview section of the Bronx, New York City.

Opened in 1924, the original school ran for seventy years before being shut down in 1997 for poor performance. The original building now houses seven smaller high schools: the Monroe Academy for Visual Arts and Design (H.S. 692), the Monroe Academy for Business and Law (H.S. 690), the High School of World Cultures (H.S. 550), The Metropolitan Soundview Highschool (X521), Pan American International High School (X388), Mott Hall V (X242) and the newly opened Cinema School (first opened its doors for the 2009–2010 school year). The building also used to house an elementary school, The Bronx Little School.

The building was designed by William H. Gompert, who was the New York City Superintendent of School Buildings. The building was built by the T.A. Clarke Co., and is substantially identical to a handful of other high school buildings that were built in the city at the same time.

Notable alumni

 Danny Aiello, actor, who attended Monroe for two weeks before dropping out to enlist in National Guard
 Saul Bass, graphic designer, movie title sequence designer, and filmmaker
 Edward J. Bloustein, 17th president of Rutgers University
 Milton Cardona ('63), musician who recorded with Willie Colon, Hector Lavoe and Tito Puente
 Darren Carrington ('84), 8-year NFL player (Broncos, Lions, Chargers, Panthers), played in two Super Bowls
 Cornelius H. Charlton, U.S. Army soldier and Medal of Honor recipient in Korean War
 Judy Craig, Patricia Bennett, and Barbara Lee of singing group the Chiffons
 Larry Eisenberg, biomedical engineer, science fiction writer and limericist
 Jules Feiffer (‘47), cartoonist for Village Voice (won Pulitzer Prize in editorial cartooning); author, playwright and screenwriter
 Paul A. Fino, GOP Congressman and State Senator, representing the Bronx
 Art Fleming ('41), original host of TV's Jeopardy! and former Monroe football star
 Anna Gajar, Professor Emeritus at Pennsylvania State University
 Stan Getz, jazz saxophonist
 Nathan Glazer, sociologist who co-authored Beyond the Melting Pot
 Izzy Goldstein, Major League Baseball player 
 Hank Greenberg ('29), Major League Baseball player with Detroit Tigers, 2-time American League MVP and Hall of Famer; led Monroe to PSAL basketball championship in 1927 and PSAL baseball title in 1929, three-sport All-City selection in soccer, basketball and baseball
 Lenny Hambro, jazz musician (woodwinds), notably with bands of Gene Krupa, Glenn Miller, Machito, and Chico O'Farrill
 Jonathan Harris ('31), actor
 Robert Johnson, first Black American to serve as the Bronx County District Attorney (January 1, 1989) in history of New York State; in 2005, he became longest-serving District Attorney in Bronx County history; Monroe graduate and U.S. Navy veteran
Herbert E. Klarman, American public health economist
 Martin J. Klein ('39), historian of modern physics and senior editor of The Collected Papers of Albert Einstein (Princeton University Press) from 1988 to 1998; first winner (2005) of Abraham Pais Prize, first major award for history of physics
 Karen Koslowitz, New York City Council member representing Queens
 Ed Kranepool ('62), Major League Baseball player, signed by New York Mets just days after his 1962 graduation from Monroe, one of 1962 Mets and member of 1969 World Series champions
 Leon M. Lederman ('39), Nobel Laureate in Physics in 1988
Samuel Lubell, public opinion pollster, journalist, and National Book Award for Nonfiction finalist (1957)
 Juliet Man Ray, dancer and model, wife and muse of artist Man Ray
 Judith Merril, science-fiction author and editor
 Stanley Milgram, social psychologist
 Dan Monzon ('64), baseball infielder, manager and scout
 Malloy Nesmith, Sr ('88), streetball player
 Estelle Reiner ('32), actor and singer
 Regina Resnik, opera singer and actor
 Ellie Rodríguez ('64), former Major League Baseball player
 Lennie Rosenbluth ('52), college and NBA basketball player
 Mickey Rutner, Major League Baseball player
 Nancy Savoca, Sundance Film Festival Grand Jury Award-winning filmmaker
 Paul R. Screvane, politician
 Art Shay ('39), photographer and writer
 Robert Strauss, actor, Academy Award-nominated for role in Stalag 17
 Anthony Velonis, WPA artist who helped introduce silkscreen printing to mainstream as fine art form
 Cora Walker, one of first black women to practice law in New York
 Doris Wishman, filmmaker
 Wilbur Young ('67), former defensive lineman in National Football League
 Philip Zimbardo, social psychologist

References 

Defunct high schools in the Bronx
Educational institutions established in 1924
Public high schools in the Bronx
Soundview, Bronx

1924 establishments in New York City